Kesteven and Sleaford High School (KSHS), is a selective school with academy status for girls aged between eleven and sixteen and girls and boys between sixteen and eighteen, located on Jermyn Street in the small market town of Sleaford, Lincolnshire, England, close to Sleaford railway station.

History

Background 
In the late 19th century, Sleaford's solitary secondary school – Carre's Grammar School – admitted boys only. From 1893, Kesteven County Council's Technical Instruction Committee offered annual junior scholarships (which would pay school fees), but the only place they were tenable for girls was at the Lincoln Secondary School for Girls. As the Sleaford Gazette reported, a problem facing Sleaford at the turn of the 20th century was that there was no school "supplying a good, high-class education for the daughters and young children of middle-class and well-to-do residents in Sleaford and neighbourhood".

In the late 1890s, the county council wanted to expand Sleaford's secondary education provision. When the governors of Carre's Grammar School applied to the Technical Instruction Committee for a grant towards a new school building, the council wished to make the grant conditional on the school accepting girls. The governors suggested creating a separate girls' high school, but discussions turned to creating a combined high school for boys and girls; by 1899, plans had been approved by the county council and costed at £4,000, of which the council offered to provide £1,500. The Sleaford Tradesmen's Association supported the scheme and began fundraising. By September, they had raised £540 and the school governors had raised a further £650, but £1,100 remained to be found. Aside from a commitment from Henry Chaplin to contribute £50 towards the cost, the situation had not changed by December. By August 1900, a local newspaper reported that "no further action had been taken towards the construction of High Schools at Sleaford owing to the lack of funds, about £1,000 more being required."

1901–02: Origins 
The problem was solved in 1901, when a syndicate of local gentlemen and businessmen launched a venture to establish a school for girls on a private basis. In November 1901, E. H. Godson purchased the architect Charles Kirk's mansion house on Southgate (along with five cottages and stabling) for £2,150; Godson was acting on behalf of a "syndicate of residents, who propose to convert it into a High School for girls". A company, The Sleaford and Kesteven High School for Girls Ltd, was incorporated on 12 December 1901. Its board of directors was chaired by W. V. R. Fane. By early January 1902, the directors had issued 2,500 shares at a £1 each and proceeded to allotment. Margaret Lewer, from Lincoln High School, was appointed headmistress and the school scheduled its opening for after Easter. Shortly before the school opened, the board of directors had asked the county council for grant in aid towards equipping and maintaining the school buildings, but the Board of Education would not sanction it because the school was for-profit. The school opened on 6 May 1902 and had 23 girls in attendance on its first day, taught by Lewer and two members of staff; there were five boarders.

1902–19: Private school 
The school was arranged into three forms: the youngest (kindergarten) were under 8; the middle were juniors, aged 8 to 12; and the eldest (seniors) were aged over 12. Boys under the age of 8 could attend. Most students were fee-paying. The amount depended on their form; in 1905, the parents of a child in kindergarten paid £1 5s a term, while the termly fees for juniors were £2 12s and for seniors £3 3s. These fees covered the provision of a "main course", while parents would pay additional fees towards stationery and meals, and could opt (at further cost) for their children to partake in games and "extra" courses (see Curriculum). As soon as the school opened, the Technical Instruction Committee agreed to add the school to the list of places where the county's Minor Scholarships were tenable. These enabled girls to attend without paying fees, but there were relatively few and girls qualified by sitting the eleven-plus examination; the number of free places changed depending on the number of fee-payers.

The school occupied Kirk's house on Southgate, where the main school room for juniors (with 21 desks) overlooked the long gardens which had been laid out as croquet and tennis lawns. The kindergarten room overlooked Southgate and doubled as the dining room, while the senior pupils occupied a room upstairs set up for 11 pupils. The headmistress, assistant mistresses and boarders also lived in the building. By 1904, a brick building had been added to the site (at the end of the house's garden), adding four classrooms, a music room and a cloakroom. A dining room and dormitory for boarders were added to the original house c. 1904. In 1905, there were 93 pupils on roll, 23 of them boarders and 3 of them boys. In 1909, the company secretary asked the Board of Education about the school's eligibility for grants under the Regulations for Secondary Schools; the Board advised that the school would be eligible if the company were wound down and converted into an Educational Trust under a scheme made by the Board of Education. The Board would regard the paid-up share capital of £2,250 as debentures, which could be redeemed within 30 years. Four years later, the county council inquired about having the school registered as a Pupil Teacher Centre, but in 1914 the Board would not allow this as the school was still being run for profit.

1919–44: Conversion to state school and new buildings 
In 1918, the county council decided to take over the running of the school and purchase its premises. The company was voluntarily wound up in December 1918. The takeover was completed in 1919, and it was around this time that the name changed to Kesteven and Sleaford High School. The school remained fee-paying (with the exception of scholarship students), still accepted boarders and retained its preparatory school for young children (including boys). In 1920, wooden huts were added on a stretch of unkept grassland called "The Wilderness". The new building provided an office for the headmistress, a biology room, an assembly hall, a cloakroom and three classrooms. Two brick rooms were added in 1924, the original house was extended in 1927, the garden path was covered in 1929, and another wooden classroom was added c. 1930. Plans to completely rebuild the school were drawn up in the early 1930s, but were never enacted; more temporary buildings were added in 1937.

1944–70: Postwar expansion and abolition of fees 
The Education Act 1944 made secondary education available to all children up to the age of 15 and abolished fees for state-schooling; a "tripartite system" of secondary schooling was established to provide curricula based on aptitude and ability: grammar schools for "academic" pupils, secondary moderns for practical studies, and technical schools for science and engineering. Pupils were allocated to them depending on their score in the eleven-plus examination. As a result, KSHS wound down its preparatory school during the mid-1940s and the County Selection Examination was used for all admissions.

The playground and netball pitch was replaced by prefabricated concrete blocks containing classrooms, a canteen and a kitchen in 1946-47. By the early 1950s, there were 330 pupils by 20 staff at the school. In 1952, as part of the school's golden jubilee celebrations, staff and pupils at the school proposed purchasing land behind the school house. Owned by British Railways, the firm eventually agreed a price of £750; over a three-year period, the school raised the funds through donations from parents, staff and local people. The playing fields were eventually purchased, but delays meant that they were not opened until 1962. A major building programme began in 1957 across three phases, which removed much of the temporary accommodation and added modern buildings. In the first phase, the Council erected a single-storey block of science classrooms and laboratories on the site of disused air-raid shelters. For phase two, three classrooms were torn down; a second storey was added to the science block; and a dining hall, kitchen, a music room, administration area, reception, changing rooms, and sixth form facilities were built. The third phase took place in 1967–68, and included the addition of classrooms for eight subjects.

1970–79: Comprehensive debate 
The educational opportunities for secondary modern pupils were limited compared to those at grammar schools, prompting criticism of the tripartite system. A reluctance to improve secondary moderns or expand grammar schools under the Conservatives prompted the Labour Government to issue Circular 10/65 in 1965 which requested local education authorities convert to a comprehensive system. In 1971, Sleaford parents voted in favour of comprehensive education, but rejected the Council's proposals. New plans were unveiled in 1973: the High School and the Secondary Modern sites were to become mixed 11–16 schools and Carre's would become a sixth form college. Parents voted for the plans (1,199 to 628) with a 50% turnout. The County Council approved them, but allowed governors a veto. Following negotiations with governors at Carre's, the scheme was revised in 1974 so that Carre's and the High School would become 11–18 schools; the secondary modern would be closed, its site at Westholme absorbed by the KSHS.

Despite support from most staff and all three headteachers, the new Lincolnshire County Council voted to return the scheme for further consultation in January 1975, a move the Sleaford Standard called "politically motivated". Two of the leading opponents, councillors Eric Fairchild and Reg Brealey, were governors at the secondary modern and Brealey was a former pupil there. He proposed a three-school system, arguing it offered more choice: the secondary modern would be consolidated at Westholme as a single-site 11–16 school; Carre's and the High School would also take 11–16-year-olds and operate Sixth Forms. Fairchild argued that this would be more popular and cheaper. After the Government ordered the Council to submit a comprehensive proposal in 1977, it voted to submit the three-school system, which had become popular with parents and was championed by Brealey, who had become chairman of the Governors at the Secondary Modern. But, the Labour Education Secretary, Shirley Williams, dismissed the proposals in 1978 on grounds that the Sixth Forms would be too small. The council then voted against the two-school system again.

1980–2011: Expansion 
In the 1979 general election, a Conservative government came to power and the Council shifted focus towards retaining Grammar Schools where they still existed and improving schools where work had been put on hold during the comprehensive debate; despite 90% of English councils adopting comprehensive education, Lincolnshire had resisted. In 1983, the three Sleaford schools launched a formal collaboration called the Sleaford Joint Sixth Form wherein pupils would remain officially based at one school, but could enroll on sixth form courses offered at any of the schools in the consortium. This was to enable the widest range of choice in courses.

2011–present: Academy conversion and takeover 
In March 2013, the Sleaford Target reported that the headteacher Craig Booker was proposing to introduce "an adjusted staffing structure which includes some new opportunities for staff whilst improving effectiveness, particularly across the support functions of the school". This was partly in anticipation of changes to the school's funding. In May 2013, the same newspaper reported that eight members of staff had been made redundant at the school; the trade union UNISON reported that "substantial changes" were being introduced to some other staff members' pay and working practices. Booker defended the decision saying that the school would "need to become as efficient as possible in their use of public funding".

In 2014, the governors of Carre's Grammar School announced their intention to bid for conversion to a multi-Academy trust and became a coeducational, selective school on a new site; in February 2015, Kesteven and Sleaford High School announced its intention to join the proposed trust, a move welcomed by Carre's. On 1 September 2015, the school officially became part of the Robert Carre Multi-Academy Trust, which would see the schools operate on their sites sharing staff and facilities. KSHSSA's chair of Governors, Robin Baker, became a trustee prompting his replacement as chair by Deborah Hopkins. The headteacher, Craig Booker, resigned.

School structure
Kesteven and Sleaford High School opened as an Academy on 1 November 2011 without sponsorship and run by the Kesteven and Sleaford Academy Trust. As of 2015, the student body is made up of 769 pupils aged between 11 and 18. The school admits girls on a selective basis for Years 7–11 and has a co-educational Sixth Form; there are 10 boys on roll as of 2015. The majority of pupils are White British and, as of 2015, 1.3% of the pupils are allocated free school meals; when assessed by Ofsted in 2013, the inspectors reported that the proportion of students receiving FSM, disabled students and pupils with special educational needs are all "much lower than the national average".

The annual intake to Year 7 for Key Stage 3 is around 120, although in 2006 the number rose to 150. School pupils are drawn from a 200 square mile area of South Lincolnshire, and as far as Newark-on-Trent in Nottinghamshire.

The sixth form takes both boys and girls and in 2013 was ranked at 117th in the country for its A levels results due to around 70% of Grades at A Level being A*-B. In 2014 the school was ranked 170th, with 62.45% of A levels being A*-B. In 2015 the school was ranked 200th, with 59.5% of A levels being A*-B.

Curriculum

Examinations
Of KSHS pupils, 100% gain five or more GCSEs at A*-C, and over 80% achieve A*-B. More than 90% of the AS/A2 level students go on to higher education.

Extra-curricular activities

School clubs and societies include art club, drama club, the school choir, computing club, history club, technology club, the school orchestra and young enterprise and journalist clubs. The school put on a performance of She Stoops to Conquer in 1924, but drama did not become a regular fixture until 1934, when an inter-form competition was arranged by Miss B. de L. Holmes; it was carried on until at least the late 1970s. Since 1996 the school has put on an annual musical performance or a play. From the very early years, the school also had cricket and tennis teams, who practised first in a field by King Edward Street and later at the town's cricket and tennis club grounds. In the 1920s and 1930s, sports days were conducted on Mr Coney's fields; alongside swimming lessons at Sleaford's baths, the school games were sports hockey, netball, tennis and stoolball (later replaced by rounders). By the 1970s, athletics and gymnastics were also a staple of sports education. As of 2015, Sports clubs include athletics, badminton, basketball, dance, fitness, football, gymnastics, hockey, netball, rounders, tennis and volleyball.

From its inception, the High School ran regular field trips, including excursions to Lord Tennyson's birthplace, the Wolds and the coast. The second headmistress, Miss Kirk, took large numbers of girls on visits to the Lake and Peak Districts; outings to Paris and Stratford were smaller affairs, while a contingent travelled to the Wembley exhibition in 1924. Geography trips to youth hostels around Britain were regularly organised after World War II, but in the 1960s, the school participated in education cruises aboard HMT Dunera and took trips to Russia, France and Holland. As of 2015, the school typically offers groups of pupils the opportunity to take part residential trips to France (in year 9), Holland (art students in year 10), London (drama students in years 10–13) and Germany (year 11 history students), alongside language exchanges. Theatre and field trips are also offered, especially in years 7 and 8, and since 1962 pupils have taken part in Duke of Edinburgh Award expeditions.

Girl guiding has a long history at the school. In the early 1920s, the school had two companies of girl guides, but after their captain, Miss Gittings, left in 1925, the school groups were amalgamated with the town's company. The group was revived in 1955 as the 4th Sleaford Company led by Miss Outram. The company was active throughout the 1960s and 1970s, although Outram became divisional commander in 1969 and Misses Hudson and Broughton took over the school's guides, which were split into four patrols. As of 2015, the 4th Sleaford (High School) Guides schedule weekly meetings on Thursdays at 4:00 pm.

A house system has existed since the school's early days, when the first houses were named Green and Yellow, after the school colours. They competed in sports events and later academic house contests for trophy donated by E. Godson. In 1923 the growing school roll led to Red and White houses being instituted. In c. 1948, the system was reorganised by the school council so that six houses, named after prominent Lincolnshire families, were created: Brownlow (yellow), Cracroft (green), Dymoke (purple), Heneage (blue), Thorold (white) and Whichcote (red). These were run by pupil House Captains and their deputies until 1973, when staff took over their organisation. As of 2015, pupils are allocated into one of four houses upon arrival at KSHSSA: Aveland, Flaxwell, Loveden and Winnibrig (named after wapentakes); inter-house competitions are run each year, ranging from academic events to Sports Day.

Awards
The school's Ofsted report for 2013, carried out in May found the school to be of a 'Good' standard. Inspectors praised students at KSHS as having outstanding attitudes to learning. Teaching is described as good with a significant proportion that is outstanding. A key factor they identified in lessons was the excellent relationships between staff and students. The report stated that students feel safe and secure at the school which has a ‘calm and purposeful atmosphere’ complimenting KSHS students as being ‘considerate, courteous and polite at all times’.

Buildings

No. 62 Southgate was built by the local contractor Charles Kirk for himself some time before 1850. Constructed to a Jacobean style, the stone house spans three storeys with three gables, the central one being moulded. Between canted windows on either side, the central section projects forward with quoins and includes an arched doorway with pilasters. Iron rails atop a stone wall separate the house from the street, and steps lead up to the doorway. Two pre-Conquest stone fragments, likely 11th century, are inlaid into a wall.

A new block housing a library, three classrooms, a laboratory and office space was completed in September 2005 and officially opened the following December, when it was named after a former teacher, Jenny Cattermole. The school has its own playing fields on-site.

Headteachers

Notable teachers

 Guy de la Bédoyère, Romanist and contributor to Time Team

Notable former pupils 

Sheila Allen (née McKenny; 1930–2009), sociologist: Professor of Sociology, University of Bradford (1972–99); President, British Sociological Association (1975–77).

References

Notes

Citations

Bibliography
 Edmonds, Kate; Venn, Elizabeth (1977). A School Remembers: Kesteven and Sleaford High School 1902–1977 (privately printed by the school)
 Pawley, Simon (1996). The Book of Sleaford (Baron Birch for Quotes Ltd.)

External links
 Kesteven and Sleaford High School Selective Academy

Grammar schools in Lincolnshire
Girls' schools in Lincolnshire
Educational institutions established in 1902
1902 establishments in England
Academies in Lincolnshire

Sleaford